Statistics of Swiss Super League in the 1924–25 season.

East

Table

Results

Central

Table

Results

West

Table

Results

Final

Table

Results 

|colspan="3" style="background-color:#D0D0D0" align=center|3 May 1925

|-
|colspan="3" style="background-color:#D0D0D0" align=center|17 May 1925

|-
|colspan="3" style="background-color:#D0D0D0" align=center|7 June 1925

Servette Genf won the championship.

Sources 
 Switzerland 1924-25 at RSSSF

Seasons in Swiss football
Swiss Football League seasons
1924–25 in Swiss football
Swiss